David Siu Chung-hang (born 24 February 1964) is a former Hong Kong TVB  actor.  He is best known for his role as Ting How-hai (丁孝蟹) in the 1992 TVB series The Greed of Man.  He entered TVB in 1987 and starred in a number TV series including Behind Silk Curtains, A Trial of Lifetime, Bet On Fate, The Greed of Man, The Link, and Remembrance.  In 1994, he turned to work for ATV and devoted himself to running a 4-wheel drive conversion shop in Hong Kong.

Biography
David Siu was born in Hong Kong on 24 February 1964. He comes from a middle-class family. Before joining Hong Kong entertainment, he had graduated the architecture major at Polytechnic University in San Francisco, United States. He worked as an interior designer at a company in Hong Kong. In addition, he studied politice strategies at Berkeley University, USA.

Career
David Siu entered Hong Kong showbiz in the late 80s, as a trainee of the 17th TVB acting class in 1987, in company with the Hong Kong "Heavenly King" Aaron Kwok.

The road to stardom of David Siu was quite lucky and smooth. In 1987, TVB held a talent contest to select actors. Be supported by his friends, he entered for the contest. Eventually, he won the champion in the contest.  Immediately thereafter, TVB invited him sign up with them. Siu also wanted to give it a try, so he resigned the first job to become an actor.

Joining the entertainment less than one year, thanks to his good-looking appearance and ideal height, he impressed  film producers. TVB promoted him actively through  leading roles in many TV series. For about five years he participated in 20 series including: Behind Silk Curtains, The Tribulation of Life, Mo Min Kap Sin Fung, A triad of lifetime, Three in a crowd, The Ruin Of War, Impossible dream, The Enforcer's Experience, A Time of Taste, Land of condor, The Greed of Man, The Link, and Remembrance. Among them,  the role Ting How-hai (丁孝蟹) in the 1992 TVB  classic series The Greed of Man is his featured role in his career.

In 1993, he played the character Sung Man Jeun ( 宋文俊) - a rich and kind young man in the famous TV series in 90s – The Link. His character falls in love with a rising movie star (played by Amy Kwok). Their love in the film weathered many storms before having a happy ending. The chemistry between him and Amy Kwok is great and fantastic. They are a nice-couple in The Link. The success of this role helped  him raise his popularity in both Hong Kong and Taiwan.  Immediately, A Taiwan broadcast television invited him star in the film "Days Of Tomorrow" (天長地久).

In 1995, Siu left TVB because he had not reached agreements in signing the new contract with TVB company. Later, he signed with Asia Television (ATV) a  short contract. He shot some TV series’s ATV such as: Justic Bao, Coincidentally, and Beggar king.

Until 1997, he decided to take leave of HongKong Entertainment. He began to devote  to running a 4-wheel drive conversion shop in Hong Kong.

In 2012, he returned Hong Kong Entertainment to reshoot films. A Wall-Less World III – a short film ‘s RTHK television marked his return after many years. In 2014, he shot the film " Dot to Dot". After that, he participated in "The anniversary" in 2015. In the film, he reunited with the co-star Loletta Lee after 23 years from their success in The greed of man.

In April 2015, the classic TV series "The greed of man" was back on the  air at late night on TVB. Once again, the film created a phenomenon for the media and audience. His name became hot again.

The Unforgotten role – Ting Hou Hai

David Siu is best- known for Ting How Hai ‘s The Greed of Man. It is the unforgettable role  to Hong Kong and Asia audience. He featured the role successfully and impressively.  The contradiction in the personality of Ting How Hai has become an obsession for many audience generations. Over the years, the role has always been voted Top 100 classic characters of Hong Kong Television.

Filmography

Movies
Dealy lovers (1988) 	 	 
Fatal Love (1993) as Officer Ma	 	 
Fussy ghost (1993)	 	 
Vampire family (1993) as Johnny	 
Island Fear (1994) as Ken Mok	 	 
To love Ferrari (1994) as Sam	 	 
Girls Unbotton (1994) as Mr Pong Kwong Yim	
City Maniac (1995) as Policeman
Dot 2 dot (2014)
Anniversary (2015)
Refuge II (2015) as Rob (Hollywood film)
Napping Kid (2018)

TV series
The final verdict (1988) 
Behind Silk Curtains (1988) as Ling Ka Ming
A friend in need (1988) as Fang Hao Ming 
The Tribulation of Life (1988) as Cheng Yi 
Mo Min Kap Sin Fung(1989) as Hau Man-Wan
A triad of lifetime (1989)
Three in a crowd (1989)
The Enforcer's Experience (1990) as Gao Man Piew
When things get touch (1990)
A Time of Taste (1990) as Yuk Hung Chim/Yuk Hung Go
The Ruin Of War (1991) 
Impossible dream (1991) as Ting Tai Ti
Land of condors (1992) 
Bet on fate (1992)
The Greed of Man (1992) as Ting How-hai
 The Link (1993) as Sung Man Jeun
The kungfu kid (1994)
Remembrance (1994) as Long Wu
Coincidentally (1997)
SFC 3 (2015)

References

External links

 David Siu at the Hong Kong Movie Database

1964 births
Living people
Hong Kong male television actors
TVB actors
Asia Television
20th-century Hong Kong male actors